Michael Andrew Charles Keen (born 12 February 1963) is a Welsh former footballer who played as a goalkeeper. He made appearances in the English Football League under non-contract terms with Wrexham.

References

1953 births
Living people
Welsh footballers
Association football goalkeepers
Chester City F.C. players
Lex XI F.C. players
Wrexham A.F.C. players
English Football League players